Gloria Lozano was an actress and producer active during the golden age of Mexican cinema. She also co-wrote the 1957 film Mi influyente mujer. One Los Angeles Times reviewer described her as "a fiery actress with enormous, beautiful eyes."

Selected filmography 

 Happiness (1957) (also producer)
 La culta dama (1957) (also producer)
 Mi influyente mujer (1957) (also producer, screenwriter)
 El vengador solitario (1954)
 El tesoro de la muerte (1954)
 La duquesa del Tepetate (1951)
 Donde nacen los pobres (1950)
 Sentencia (1950)
 The Perez Family (1949)
 Secreto entre mujeres (1949)
 Los viejos somos así (1948)
 La novia de la Marina (1948)
 El cuarto mandamiento (1948)
 Músico, poeta y loco (1948)
 Cartas marcadas (1948)
 Que Dios me perdone (1948)
 El muchacho alegre (1948)
 Woman (1947)
 Pecadora (1947)
 Soy un prófugo (1946)

References 

Mexican women film producers
Mexican film producers
Mexican actresses